Gölle is a village in Somogy county, Hungary.

Notable people
István Fekete (1900–1970), Hungarian novelist of juvenile literature

External links 
 Street map (Hungarian)
 Official website of Gölle

References 

Populated places in Somogy County